Mohd Nur Rizuan Zainal (born  20 June 1986 in Malaysia) is a Malaysian professional racing cyclist currently riding for Team Malaysia in 2010 Tour de Langkawi.

Career highlights

 2008: 1st in Stage 8 Tour of Indonesia, Surabaya (Indonesia (with LeTua Cycling Team)
 2008: 1st in Stage 11 Tour of Indonesia, Denpasar (Indonesia (with LeTua Cycling Team)
 2009: 1st in Stage 9 Tour of Indonesia, Banyuwangi (Indonesia (with MCF Continental Team)
 1st Tour de Taiwan
 3rd Tour of Thailand
 2nd Jelajah Malaysia
 1st gp Kuala Selangor

External links
Mohd Nur Rizuan Zainal's Profile in Cycling Archives

1986 births
Living people
Malaysian male cyclists
20th-century Malaysian people
21st-century Malaysian people